Murat Kaya (15 February 1971) is a German comics author.

Kaya was born in  Hamburg, and worked for the German version of MAD.

Awards
In 2005, Kaya's illustration of the theme "Der Markenwahn: Deutschlands teure Kinder" ("Brand mania: Germany's expensive children") ranked fourth in an art workshop from German newspaper Der Spiegel.

Works 
 Überleben mit Heuschnupfen (2001)
 Liebesgrüße von der Ex (2003)

References

External links

"Liebesgrüße von der Ex" . Review at Parnass. Retrieved 29 August 2015.

1971 births
Living people
Writers from Hamburg
German male writers
German comics artists
German comics writers